George Anthony may refer to:

 George T. Anthony (1824–1896), seventh governor of Kansas
 George Anthony (cricketer) (1875–1907), English cricketer
 George Anthony (footballer) (1904–1971), Australian rules footballer for Footscray
 George Anthony (journalist) (born 1940), Canadian entertainment journalist
 George Wilfred Anthony (1810–1859), English landscape painter, art teacher and art critic
 George Anthony, grandfather of Caylee Anthony